The women's 76 kilograms competition at the 2022 World Weightlifting Championships was held on 13 December 2022.

Schedule

Medalists

Records

Results

References

Women's 76 kg
World Championships